Haykaz Galstyan (born 18 October 1977) is an Armenian Greco-Roman wrestler. He competed at the 2000 Summer Olympics and 2004 Summer Olympics in the men's 130 kg division and men's 120 kg division, coming in 13th and 9th place, respectively. Galstyan was also the flag bearer for Armenia at the 2000 Olympics and is the second Olympian to bear the flag of Armenia at the Summer Olympics.

References

External links
 

1977 births
Living people
People from Vagharshapat
Armenian male sport wrestlers
Olympic wrestlers of Armenia
Wrestlers at the 2000 Summer Olympics
Wrestlers at the 2004 Summer Olympics